Bolesław Kajetan Kołyszko alias Rutkowski, Szyszka (1838 – 9 June [O.S. 28 May] 1863) was one of the Polish-Lithuanian leaders in the January Uprising.

Early life 

Kołyszko was born into a petty noble family as a son of Wincenty Kołyszko and his wife from the Jursza family. He had an older brother, Feliksas Kolyška, who also fought in the January Uprising. Boleslovas  Kołyszko graduated from the Vilnius Gymnasium and studied law in the University of Moscow. According to Dawid Fajnhauz, he might have graduated from Lida gymnasium instead of Vilnius. In the University of Moscow,  Kołyszko was part of the Polish students association called "Ogół". He was arrested in 1861 for his involvement in student demonstrations in Lida. At the end of 1861, after a short imprisonment, he emigrated to Italy, where he met Ludwik Mierosławski. Although the Military School acquainted  Kołyszko with the military, it was impossible to develop his military talent or even qualify him for a commander in such a short time.

Uprising of 1863 
After the start of the uprising he went back to Lithuania. On 21 March 1863, he began the uprising between Čekiškė and Panevėžys. In a few days, his unit included 400 men and was also joined by the unit led by the priest Antanas Navaina. As he organized the rebel group near Kaunas during March, it was joined by the groups of Bronislavas Žarskis and Antanas Norvaiša. The combined group was called the Dubysa Regiment. The regiment had three battalions, with the battalion commanders being Bronislavas Žarskis, Antanas Norvaiša and Juozas Radavičius.  Kołyszko led his 400 men strong regiment in fights against units of the Imperial Russian Army at Aukštdvaris on March 29–30. He then fought near Lenčiai on April 1 (together with the unit of Tomas Kušleika), near  on April 11.

By Zygmunt Sierakowski's order, he led a rebel column - two battalions and a cavalry unit that fought in the battle of Biržai. On May 7,  Kołyszko was the first from the rebel columns to reach the designated spot, . They were attacked by Russian forces, but when Sierakowski came and joined the battle, the Russian attack was repelled.  Kołyszko and Sierakowski's aide-de-camp  were supposed to take wounded the Sierakowski and transport him out of the country, but they were captured on May 10. During the interrogation he blamed Sierakowski for the uprising's failure and underlined that he was doing everything for the homeland. He was hanged by a court-martial on June 9, 1863. The remains were secretly buried in Vilnius' Gediminas' Hill.

Commemoration 
Kołyszko already during his lifetime became the hero of songs and poems. One of them called Przeszły troski i frasunki... ("Troubles and sorrows are gone...") is dated 28 March 1863, the authorship of it is attributed to Vilnius-born poet . Alongside Kołyszka, it praises other leaders of the uprising in Samogitia, Lithuania and Belarus.  Kołyszko is portrayed in it as a revolutionary folk leader:

His remains were found in 2017 during the works designed to strengthen . On 22 November 2019, the remains were solemnly buried in the Columbarium of the Rasos Cemetery  in Vilnius.

Sources

Bibliography 

 
 

1838 births
1863 deaths
Lithuanian Army officers
January Uprising participants
Polish people executed by the Russian Empire